Hiram Pitt Bennet (September 2, 1826 – November 11, 1914) was a Congressional delegate from the Territory of Colorado and Colorado Secretary of State

Biography
Bennet was born in Carthage, Maine, and moved to Ohio with his parents, who settled in Richland County in 1831. He attended public and private schools in Ohio. Bennet attended the Ohio Wesleyan University in Delaware, Ohio, before taking a teaching job in northwestern Missouri in 1850. He studied law and was admitted to the bar in 1851, practicing in western Iowa and later in Glenwood, Iowa. He served as judge of the circuit court of Iowa in 1852.

Bennet moved to the Nebraska Territory in 1854, settled in Nebraska City, and continued the practice of law. He unsuccessfully contested in 1855 as a Republican the election of Bird B. Chapman to the Thirty-fourth Congress. He served as member of the Territorial council in 1856, and as member of the Territorial House of Representatives in 1858, where he served as speaker. Bennet moved to Denver, Colorado in 1859 and continued the practice of law.

Career
Upon the admission of the Territory to representation, Bennet was elected as a Conservative Republican, a Delegate to the Thirty-seventh Congress. He was the first Territorial Representative for Colorado in 1862. He was reelected to the Thirty-eighth Congress and served from August 19, 1861, to March 3, 1865. He was not a candidate for renomination in 1864. Bennet played an important role in obtaining statehood for Colorado, introducing the first bill on statehood in 1863.

Bennet served as Secretary of State of Colorado in 1867. He was appointed postmaster of Denver, Colorado, on March 26, 1869, and served until May 27, 1874, when a successor was appointed. Bennet served as a member of the first State senate in 1876. He was appointed "State Agent" in 1888, and served until 1895, recovering lands belonging to the State of Colorado which had been wrongfully disposed of.

Death and legacy
Bennet retired in 1899 and resided in Denver, Colorado, until his death, November 11, 1914. He is interred in Riverside Cemetery.

The town of Bennett, Colorado was named for Bennet.

References

External links

 The State of Colorado: The History of Bennett - A Proud Heritage
 

1826 births
1914 deaths
Members of the Nebraska Territorial Legislature
Republican Party Colorado state senators
Delegates to the United States House of Representatives from Colorado Territory
Secretaries of State of Colorado
People from Franklin County, Maine
People from Richland County, Ohio
People from Glenwood, Iowa
19th-century American politicians
People from Nebraska City, Nebraska